Richard Arnold Kraus (August 27, 1937 – December 8, 2019) was a Massachusetts educator and politician who represented the Fourth Middlesex District in the Massachusetts State Senate and who was the president of Cape Cod Community College.

Kraus was born in Hutchinson, Kansas to Wanda Myrtle (Casebolt) Kraus and Walter Raymond Kraus. He went to Hutchinson Community College and graduated from University of Kansas in 1959. In 1968, Kraus received his doctorate degree from Harvard University. Kraus served in several positions at Harvard University including dean of the Graduate School of Arts and Sciences. Kraus lived in Arlington, Massachusetts with his wife and family. He served on the Arlington school committee from 1970 to 1976 and served as chairman of the school committee. His wife was Patricia Fiero who also served in the Massachusetts General Court.

References
 Barnstable Patriot,  Obituaries Wanda Myrtle Kraus, 86 (2000).
  Commonwealth of Massachusetts, 1983–1984 Public officers of the Commonwealth of Massachusetts, Boston, MA: Commonwealth of Massachusetts, p. 59. (1983).

Footnotes

1937 births
2019 deaths
Harvard University alumni
School board members in Massachusetts
Democratic Party Massachusetts state senators
Presidents of Cape Cod Community College
University of Kansas alumni
People from Arlington, Massachusetts
Politicians from Hutchinson, Kansas